Paths is a 1973 book by the Swedish writer Tomas Tranströmer.

1973 books
Poetry by Tomas Tranströmer
Swedish poetry collections